The Tărcuța is a left tributary of the river Tarcău in Romania. It flows into the Tarcău near Ardeluța.

References

Rivers of Romania
Rivers of Neamț County